Melissa Louise Caddick (née Grimley; born 21 April 1971–disappeared 12 November 2020) was an Australian woman who vanished in November 2020 amid an investigation by the Australian Securities & Investments Commission (ASIC) for carrying on a financial services business without holding an Australian Financial Services (AFS) licence.

Caddick vanished the day after ASIC agents and Australian Federal Police officers raided her home at Dover Heights, Sydney, New South Wales, on the suspicion that she had misappropriated approximately A$30 million from investors, including her friends and family. After months of speculation as to her whereabouts, partial human remains discovered on a beach on the South Coast of New South Wales in February 2021 were confirmed to be Caddick's through DNA testing. She was subsequently declared deceased.

Early life
Melissa Caddick was born Melissa Louise Grimley on 21 April 1971, and grew up in Lugarno, a southern suburb of Sydney. 

After graduating from high school, Caddick enrolled in a secretarial and business administration course at Patrick's College Australia in Sydney. Her résumé reportedly included fictitious qualifications including degrees in finance from the University of Technology Sydney, which later said it had “no record of completion of a Graduate Diploma in Finance or Masters of Business in Finance – or indeed any qualification – under the name of Melissa Caddick or Melissa Grimley.”

Career
After initially working in NRMA's investment division, Caddick joined the Sydney branch of a boutique investment bank as an office administrator. It has been alleged that in 1998, six months after taking the job, she was discovered to have stolen less than $2,000 from the company by forging her boss's signature on several cheques. It is understood that rather than pursue prosecution, the company gave Caddick the option of leaving the office without the police being summoned or the money being returned. 

Shortly afterwards, Caddick was hired as a financial advisor for Wise Financial Services, a subsidiary of ING, and eventually purchased a 25% stake in the business after borrowing $750,000. By 2003 she had become so well-regarded in her field that she was featured on a cover of the trade magazine IFA (Independent Financial Advisor). However, Caddick fell out with Wise when the company refused to allow her to recommend property and shares to her clients due to compliance rules.

In later years, Caddick's extravagant spending drew suspicion among her acquaintances. It has been alleged that when questioned about how she could financially support her lavish lifestyle, she concocted differing stories about a windfall payment she had received from Wise, either in the form of an $86 million severance package or a similarly large payout from a sexual harassment claim. In reality, the only money she received in the separation from Wise was a return of her original $750,000 investment consequent to signing a five-year non-compete agreement.

Personal life
Caddick's first husband, Tony Caddick, was a builder's labourer originally from England. They married in a ceremony at the Garrison Church in Millers Point, Sydney, on 20 April 2000. Their son, born in 2006, was aged 14 at the time of Caddick's disappearance in 2020. At his wife's urging, Tony, who had studied political science back in England, completed his law degree and was admitted as a solicitor. In 2010, the family moved abroad to Essex to live closer to Tony's family while he commuted daily to his job in London.

It has been reported that Caddick did not work when she lived in England and quickly found herself bored with her surroundings. Claiming she needed to brush up on her financial skills, she persuaded her husband to agree to letting her travel to Switzerland for a conference. Tony later learned from a mutual friend that Caddick had actually travelled to Paris to meet with Anthony Koletti, her hairdresser from Sydney, and discovered that she had paid for his international travel expenses to continue their affair. Upon being confronted by Tony, Caddick cleaned out their home in Essex, emptied their joint bank accounts, and moved back to Sydney with their son in January 2012. Upon returning to Australia, she falsely claimed to family and friends that Tony had been a controlling and abusive spouse. The couple divorced in 2013, and Caddick married Koletti later that year.

Ponzi scheme
During an eight-year period, from October 2012 until 2019, it is believed Caddick misappropriated A$30 million in client funds which primarily came from family and friends. It is understood she deposited these funds into 37 bank accounts. The Federal Court of Australia discovered that her behaviour intensified each year, with her most profitable year being 2019. Caddick had allegedly spent investors’ finances on two houses in Sydney’s eastern suburbs, as well as on luxury cars, designer clothing, artwork, and jewellery. 

As clients invested money, Caddick created fabricated CommSec portfolio statements and fake account numbers to show her investors what return they had achieved, making them falsely believe they had invested in shares. Counsel for Australian Securities & Investments Commission (ASIC), Farid Assaf SC, said that "as befitting a successful businesswoman," Caddick used the proceeds of her crimes to acquire "all the trappings of wealth” and that her "success was all a facade and the financial services business was an elaborate front for Ms. Caddick’s Ponzi scheme."

In April 2021, after Caddick's presumed death, ASIC dropped 38 criminal charges against her. In November 2021, the court found that Caddick, through her company Maliver, fraudulently appropriated tens of millions of investor's money, and operated without the required financial services licence between October 2012 and November 2020. It was announced that Caddick's possessions, including her $6 million Sydney house, would be sold in an effort to repay the 72 clients who claimed that they were owed more than A$23 million. In February 2022, Koletti objected to the sale of the house, and the Federal Court gave Caddick's family six weeks to stake their claims over Caddick's house and a penthouse apartment in Edgecliff where Caddick's parents resided. Caddick's parents made a claim on the basis of handing their daughter $1.03 million on the understanding they would own part of the Edgecliff apartment and have life tenancy. In April 2022, Caddick's parents said in a statement filed in the Federal Court that “Melissa dishonestly and fraudulently” took their money. In April 2022, Koletti made a claim through the Federal Court for a share of Caddick's assets,  including her Gucci wedding dress, $7 million in shares, $2 million worth of jewellery, two properties he claimed were valued at $20 million and the proceeds from the sale of their luxury cars. In May 2022, the Federal Court ordered Koletti to vacate their house so it could be sold by liquidators. Caddick's Dover Heights house was sold for an undisclosed sum in October 2022. In December 2022, clothing, art, luxury goods and jewellery belonging to Caddick were sold at auction for $860,000. In January 2023, it was reported that Caddick's home was sold for $9.8 million and was originally purchased in 2014 for $6.2 million.

Disappearance and presumed death
Caddick vanished on 12 November 2020, the morning after ASIC agents and the Australian Federal Police raided her home in Dover Heights. She was last heard by her son, who detected a door shutting at around 5:30 am and presumed it was Caddick going for her daily exercise. Caddick left behind all of her possessions, including her mobile phone. On 26 February 2021, Michael Willing, assistant commissioner of the New South Wales Police Force, held a press conference regarding a break in the Caddick disappearance: the previous Sunday on 21 February, a shoe containing a decomposed human foot was discovered washed up on Bournda Beach on the state's south coast, just south of Tathra, some 500km from where Caddick was last seen. The shoe matched her size and fit the description of the footwear she was seen wearing during the raid of her home on 11 November 2020. Subsequent DNA testing of samples gathered from her toothbrush, as well as from family members, confirmed the foot belonged to Caddick. 

The foot's southern location matched the tidal and drift pattern modelling undertaken by the marine police, raising the possibility that if a body had entered the water near Dover Heights around the time of her disappearance it would likely reach the shore somewhere near the south-coast town of Bermagui, which is just 40km north of Tathra. 

According to Willing, Caddick's disappearance was distressing for many people, including her clients, family and friends. Although there was an extensive review of CCTV footage, her exact whereabouts after leaving her house were unknown as the footage did not cover the entire area from where she disappeared. Willing also described the case as one of the most high profile missing person cases he had seen in thirty years.

Hypotheses
How Caddick's foot ended up in the ocean is unknown. University of Newcastle Associate Professor of Criminology Dr Xanthé Mallett, who spoke to Seven Network's Weekend Sunrise in March 2022, pointed out that losing a foot should not immediately mean Caddick is deceased, saying, “When it was just a foot I would caution against the possibility that somebody is deceased. You can survive without your foot.” In an October 2021 interview, Koletti claimed that Caddick never stole any money and that someone killed his wife.  Other theories suggested by criminologists include Caddick going into hiding or even cutting off her own foot as a red herring. Alternatively, it has been theorized that Koletti was assisting her in hiding. By December 2022 she was declared dead. In February 2023, an inquest was told the police concluded she likely died after jumping from the cliffs at Rodney Reserve, around 500 metres from her home.

In popular culture
Caddick's life was dramatised in the Nine Network's television miniseries Underbelly: Vanishing Act in 2022 with Caddick played by Kate Atkinson.

See also
List of solved missing person cases
List of unsolved deaths

References

1971 births
2020 in Australia
2020s missing person cases
20th-century Australian businesspeople
21st-century Australian businesspeople
Businesspeople from Sydney
Financial scandals
Formerly missing people
Missing person cases in Australia
People declared dead in absentia
People from Sydney
Pyramid and Ponzi schemes
Unsolved deaths in Australia